Dana Chladek (born Dana Chládková on December 27, 1963, in Czechoslovakia) is a Czechoslovak slalom kayaker who later become a naturalized American. She competed from the early 1980s to the mid-1990s. Competing in two Summer Olympics, she won two medals in the K1 event with a silver in 1996 and a bronze in 1992.

Chladek also won six medals at the ICF Canoe Slalom World Championships with four silvers (K1: 1989, 1991; K1 team: 1989, 1993) and two bronzes (K1 team: 1987, 1991). In 1988 she won the inaugural edition of the World Cup series.

Currently, Dana Chladek is a coach and race director for the Potomac Whitewater Racing Center. Chladek and her team of coaches oversee whitewater training programs for young people who are intent on pursuing high levels of excellence, including Olympic and World Cup level competition. Chladek’s program is based on the Potomac River in the Washington D.C. area. Chladek’s hand-picked coaching team is the highest level provided in the United States.

World Cup individual podiums

References
 Potomac Whitewater Racing Center
 
 

1963 births
American female canoeists
Czechoslovak emigrants to the United States
Canoeists at the 1992 Summer Olympics
Canoeists at the 1996 Summer Olympics
American people of Czech descent
Living people
Olympic silver medalists for the United States in canoeing
Olympic bronze medalists for the United States in canoeing
International whitewater paddlers
Medalists at the 1996 Summer Olympics
Medalists at the 1992 Summer Olympics
People from Děčín
21st-century American women